Justin O'Dell (born 1974, Detroit, Michigan) is an American clarinetist, international concert artist, Michigan State University professor, and orchestral and chamber musician. He earned degrees from Western Michigan University (BM), Yale University (MM), University of Michigan (DMA) with further studies at the Hochschule für Musik Karlsruhe in Germany.

He assumed a position at Michigan State University's College of Music in the autumn of 2008, succeeding the retiring Elsa Ludewig Verhehr, long serving professor of clarinet.

O'Dell was appointed by the Louisiana State University School of Music in 2005. His professional activities include concert appearances in North America, Europe, and South America, university guest lectures, and international music festivals. He performs with the Pelican Chamber Music Series and the Timm Quintet.

He won the gold medal and first prize at the 2007 Mercadante International Clarinet Competition with his Trio Sofia (together with Borislava Iltcheva (violin) and Akiko Konishi (piano), the first time the top prize was awarded in the competition's history. He was appointed principal clarinetist of the Acadiana Symphony Orchestra in Lafayette, Louisiana in 2007.

References

1974 births
Living people
American classical clarinetists
Michigan State University faculty
Louisiana State University faculty
Western Michigan University alumni
Yale University alumni
University of Michigan School of Music, Theatre & Dance alumni
Date of birth missing (living people)
Classical musicians from Michigan
21st-century clarinetists